This is a list of Malaysian football transfers for the 2015 second transfer window. Moves featuring Malaysia Super League, Malaysia Premier League and Malaysia FAM Cup club are listed.

2015 second transfer window opened on 1 April and closed on 28 April.

2015 Second Transfers 
All clubs without a flag are Malaysian. Otherwise it will be stated.

Transfers

Loans

Unattached Players

Notes

References

2015
Tranfers
Malaysia